James Paratore (August 13, 1953 – May 29, 2012) was an American television producer and longtime Warner Bros executive whose credits included The Ellen DeGeneres Show, The Tyra Banks Show, and The Rosie O'Donnell Show. Paratore co-founded the TMZ web site, and the company ParaMedia in 2005 and its companion television show, TMZ on TV, in 2007.

Biography

Early life
A native of Louisiana, Paratore earned a bachelor's degree in communications from Loyola University New Orleans.

Career
Paratore began his career as a programming director for several Florida television stations before joining Telepictures.

Paratore was the president of Warner Bros. Telepictures Productions from 1992 to 2006. He developed Telepictures' slate of daytime syndicated and prime time reality shows, including ABC's The Bachelor. As President of Telepictures, Paratore oversaw the creation of some of the studio's most prominent shows, including  The Ellen DeGeneres Show, The Rosie O'Donnell Show Paratore remained the executive producer of The Ellen DeGeneres Show, the syndicated daytime talk show which debuted in 2003, even after departing his Telepictures in 2006.

He also served as the vice president of Warner Bros. Domestic Television Distribution from 2002 until his death in 2012.

Death
Paratore died of a heart attack while bicycling in Paris, France, on May 29, 2012, at the age of 58. He was survived by his first wife (Michele Richie) of 13 years and mother of his only daughter Martinique (Martini) Paratore, and his second wife Jill Wickert.

References

External links

1953 births
2012 deaths
American television producers
American television executives
Loyola University New Orleans alumni
People from Louisiana
Death in France